George David Brandon Jones (born 1993), known professionally as Topaz Jones, is an American rapper and singer.

Early life 
Jones was born in 1993 in Montclair, New Jersey, where he was raised. His father Curt Jones was a funk guitarist who played in the bands Slave and Aurra, and his mother was a Harvard scholar. He graduated from the New York University Tisch School of the Arts.

Musical career 
In 2013, Jones released his debut single "Coping Mechanism".

Jones's debut album, The Honeymoon Suite, was released in 2014. His second album, Arcade, was released in 2016. This album featured the single Tropicana, which Pitchfork described as a "viral hit", and Motion Sickness.

In 2021, Jones released the visual album Don't Go Tellin' Your Momma, an album accompanied by a short film of the same name directed by Jones and directing duo Rubberband. The film won the Sundance Film Festival Short Film Jury Award, as well as South by Southwest's Special Jury Recognition for Visionary Storytelling. After the award victories, the film was made available online as part of The New York Times' Op-Docs video series. The album was described by Stereogum as "one of the best albums of 2021".

Discography

Studio albums

Mixtapes

References 

1993 births
21st-century American male musicians
21st-century American rappers
21st-century American male singers
21st-century American singers
American male rappers
Trap musicians
American hip hop singers
American funk singers
Living people
Rappers from New Jersey
Singers from New Jersey
Filmmakers from New Jersey